Zoo di Pistoia is a Zoo and Amusement park in Pistoia, Tuscany, Italy, created in 1970 with an area of 75,000 square metres.

External links
Official website

References

Zoos in Italy
Tourist attractions in Tuscany
Parks in Tuscany
Buildings and structures in Pistoia
Zoos established in 1970